Wagstaffe is a south-eastern suburb of the Central Coast region of New South Wales, Australia on the Bouddi Peninsula. It is part of the  local government area. It was named after Captain Wagstaffe, one of the first settlers in the area. It has a general store, which is also the local post office. It is a thin slither of around 200 houses between the bay and the bush(Bouddi National Park). Historically it was also known as Wagstaffe Point. In aboriginal dialect the point is called Kourang Gourang.  A ferry service operates between Wagstaffe and Palm Beach(via Ettalong). Travel time is 30 minutes.

References

Suburbs of the Central Coast (New South Wales)